Pinselly Classified Forest is situated in Mamou Prefecture, south-eastern part of Fouta Djallon Highlands in Guinea. The closest city is Ouré-Kaba. The protected area is characterized by dry montane forests, tall-grassed savanna patches, and dense evergreen vegetation with giant trees in the moist valleys. It is a home for forest elephants, hippopotamuses, and a large diversity of primates and ungulates. Reported species are among others Diana monkey, patas monkey, olive baboon, Western bongo, bushbuck, and red-flanked duiker. In fact, there is a high density of the endangered Western chimpanzee, and this area is a stronghold for the species, together with the nearby Soya Classified Forest. Pinselly Classified forest has a good potential in wildlife tourism, due to its relative proximity to Conakry (300 km). The forest can be reached within 7 hours from the capital by city car.

Gallery

See also 
 Guinea
 Wildlife of Guinea
 Fouta Djallon
 Mamou Prefecture
 Ouré-Kaba

External links 
 http://www.mammalwatching.com/places/guinea/

Forests of Guinea
Mamou Region
Protected areas of Guinea